Henri Maquet (30 August 1839 – 27 November 1909) was a Belgian architect, best known for his work for King Leopold II of Belgium.

Born in Brussels, Maquet trained in Liege, at the Académie Royale des Beaux-Arts in Brussels, then worked in the office of Hendrik Beyaert.   His work includes:

 , Ostend, 1900-1903
 Royal Military Academy, Avenue de la Renaissance, with Henri Van Dievoet, circa 1900
 Completion of the Royal Palace of Brussels, 1904
 Work at the Brussels Park, 1907

References

Sources 
 

1839 births
1909 deaths
Architects from Brussels